Thonalmus is a genus of net-winged beetles in the family Lycidae. There are about five described species in Thonalmus, located in the Caribbean.

Species
These five species belong to the genus Thonalmus:
 Thonalmus bicolor (Linnaeus, 1763)
 Thonalmus dominicensis (Chevrolat, 1870)
 Thonalmus hubbardi Leng & Mutchler
 Thonalmus sinuaticostis Leng & Mutchler
 Thonalmus subquadratus Leng & Mutchler

References

Lycidae